Don't You Love Me may refer to:
 "Don't You Love Me" (49ers song), 1990
 "Don't You Love Me" (Eternal song), 1997
 "Don't You Love Me?", a song by The Doubleclicks from the 2012 album Chainmail and Cello